John Zizioulas (10 January 1931 – 2 February 2023) was a Greek Orthodox bishop who served as the Metropolitan of Pergamon of the Ecumenical Patriarchate of Constantinople from 1986 until his death in 2023. He was one of the most influential Orthodox Christian theologians of the 20th and 21st centuries.

Academic education and career
Metropolitan John was born in Katafygio, Velventos. His education began with study at the Universities of Thessaloniki and Athens in 1950, and then a year at the Ecumenical Institute of Bossey in 1955. Between 1960 and 1964 Zizioulas did doctoral research under the Eastern Orthodox theologian Georges Florovsky (1893-1979; Chair of Eastern Church History at Harvard and a member of the Russian Orthodox Church) and was a Fellow at Dumbarton Oaks Center for Byzantine Studies. He received his doctorate in 1965 from the University of Athens.

Zizioulas took up a post at the University of Athens in 1964 as Assistant Professor of Church History, and then six years later, worked as Professor of Patristics at the New College, Edinburgh from 1970 until 1973. He moved to the University of Glasgow where he held a personal chair in systematic theology for some fourteen years. In addition, Zizioulas also was a visiting Professor at the Research Institute in Systematic Theology of King's College London. In 1986, he was elected titular metropolitan of Pergamon. In the same year, he assumed a full-time academic post at Thessaloniki University's School of Theology as Professor of Dogmatics.

Death
Zizioulas died from COVID-19 in Athens, on 2 February 2023, at the age of 92.

Theology
The theological work of Metropolitan John has focused upon the twin themes of ecclesiology and theological ontology. The theology of Metropolitan John reflects the influence of Russian émigré theologians such as Nikolai Afanassieff, Vladimir Lossky and his teacher Georges Florovsky. Zizioulas has also been significantly influenced by the ascetical theology of Archimandrite Sophrony (Sakharov), founder of the Stavropegic Monastery of St John the Baptist in Essex, England.

Ecclesiology
Zizioulas' ecclesiology was first developed in his doctoral dissertation, subsequently published in English as Eucharist, Bishop, Church. Here Metropolitan John develops critically the eucharistic ecclesiology of Nikolai Afanassief. He accepts Afanassieff's principal contention that the Church is to be understood in terms of the Eucharist. However, he criticises Afanassief's understanding as overly congregational and insufficiently episcopal in its emphasis. Finally, Zizioulas advocates an episcopocentric understanding of Church structure, understanding the Bishop primarily as the president of the Divine Liturgy and the Eucharistic community.

Theological ontology
Zizioulas worked on the theology of the person, appealing to the work of St Irenaeus and St Maximus the Confessor. The primary focus of his work was to develop his own ontology of personhood derived from an extensive investigation of Greek philosophy, patristic era writings and modern rationalist philosophy.

He argues that full humanity is achieved only as person so that they may participate (koinonia) in the Trinitarian life of God.  However, an essential component of the ontology of personhood is the freedom to self-affirm the participation in relationship.  He continues that man initially exists as a biological hypostasis, constrained as to the types of relationships one can have (biological) and to the eventual end of this type of being - death.

He makes use of existentialist philosophers and novelists, notably the French absurdist writer Albert Camus, to show that the only type of ontological freedom in the biological hypostasis is the choice to commit suicide.  He claims that Baptism constitutes an ontological change in the human, making them an ecclesial hypostasis, or a person.  This rebirth 'from above' gives new ontological freedom as it is not constrained by the limits of biological existence.  Such ecclesial being is eschatological, meaning it is a paradoxical 'now,' but 'not yet.'  The completion of this rebirth from above is the day of resurrection when the body will no longer be subject to death.

Bibliography

Primary
'Ἡ ἑνότης τῆς Ἐκκλησίας ἐν τῇ Θείᾳ Εὐχαριστίᾳ καί τῷ Ἐπισκόπῳ κατά τούς τρεῖς πρώτους αἰώνας." (En Athi̲nais, 1965). Doctoral Dissertation. Published in French translation as "L' Eucharistie, L'évêque Et L'eglise Durant Les Trois Premiers Siècles." 2nd ed. Translated by Jean-Louis Palierne. (Paris: Desclée De Brouwer, 1994). Published in English translation as "Eucharist, Bishop, Church" (see below).L'Être ecclésial (Paris: Labor et Fides, 1981). . Published in English translation as "Being as Communion" (see below).H κτίση ως Eυχαριστία, Θεολογική προσέγγιση στο πρόβλημα της οικολογίας [Creation as Eucharist: a Theological approach to a problem of ecology] (Athens: Akritas, 1992). . This work is based on lectures previously delivered in English. Available in three parts: King's Theological Review vol. 12, no. 1 (1989): 1-5, no. 2 (1989): 41-45, vol. 13, no. 1 (1990): 1-5.Being as Communion: Studies in Personhood and the Church (Crestwood, NY: St Vladimir's Seminary Press, 1997). .Eucharist, Bishop, Church: The Unity of the Church in the Divine Eucharist and the Bishop During the First Three Centuries (Brookline, MA: Holy Cross, 2001). .Eλληνισμός και Xριστιανισμός, η συνάντηση των δύο κόσμων [Hellenism and Christianity: The meeting of two worlds] (Athens: ApostolikeDiakonia, 2003).Communion & Otherness: Further Studies in Personhood and the Church (London: T & T Clark, 2007). ; translated into Dutch by Hildegard C. Koetsveld OSB (Middelburg: Skandalon, 2019). .Lectures in Christian Dogmatics (London: T&T Clark, 2009). .
"The One And The Many" (Sebastian Press, 2010) .Remembering the Future: An Eschatological Ontology (London: T&T Clark, 2012). .

There are extensive bibliographies devoted to Zizioulas’ published works in various languages in:

McPartlan, Paul. The Eucharist Makes the Church: Henri De Lubac and John Zizioulas in Dialogue. Edinburgh: T&T Clark, 1993.
Papanikolaou, Aristotle. Being with God: Trinity, Apophaticism, and Divine-Human Communion. Notre Dame, IN: University of Notre Dame Press, 2006.
Malecki, Roman. Kosciol jako wspolnota. Dogmatyczno-ekumeniczne studium eklezjologii Johna Zizioulasa (In English: The Church as Communion. A Dogmatic and Ecumenical Study of Ecclesiology of John Zizioulas). Lublin: RW KUL, 2000.

Secondary
Alan Brown, "On the Criticism of 'Being as Communion' in Anglophone Orthodox Theology", in Douglas Knight (ed.) The Theology of John Zizioulas: Personhood and the Church (Ashgate, 2006) defends Zizioulas against several of the polemical rejections of his theological ontology.
 Aristotle Papanikolaou. Being with God: Trinity, Apophaticism, and Divine-Human Communion'' (Notre Dame, IN: University of Notre Dame Press, 2006).
Lucian Turcescu, "Person versus Individual and Other Modern Misreadings of Gregory of Nyssa", Modern Theology 18, no. 4 (October 2002): 527-539, is a polemic against Zizioulas' use of the Cappadocian Fathers, especially St Gregory of Nyssa.

See also
 Anti-individualism
 Christian philosophy
 Ecumenism
 Eucharistic theology
 Jürgen Moltmann
 Orthodox Christian theology
 Social trinitarianism

Citations

External links

 Full Bibliography for John Zizioulas with links to works available online
 Theological discussion of Zizioulas' theology
 Short biography of John Zizioulas
 Lessons On Christian Dogmatics Lectures of Professor John Zizioulas at the Poemantic Division of the Thessaloniki University's School of Theology
 Communion and Otherness
  Communion and Otherness
 Communion and Otherness: Chinese translation (traditional)
 Communion and Otherness: Chinese translation (simplified)
 The holy and sacred synod
  Article: Is John Zizioulas an Existentialist in Disguise?
 Article: Theo-Ontology: Notes on the Implications of Zizioulas' Engagement With Heidegger
 EUCHARIST, BISHOP, CHURCH: THE UNITY OF THE CHURCH IN THE DIVINE EUCHARIST AND THE BISHOP DURING THE FIRST THREE CENTURIES by the Professor Metropolitan of Pergamus and  Chairman of the Athens Academy John Zizioulas

1931 births
2023 deaths
Deaths from the COVID-19 pandemic in Greece
Greek theologians
Academics of the University of Edinburgh
Academics of King's College London
Eastern Orthodox metropolitans
Eastern Orthodox theologians
20th-century Eastern Orthodox theologians
21st-century Eastern Orthodox theologians
Members of the Academy of Athens (modern)
Bishops of the Ecumenical Patriarchate of Constantinople
Articles containing video clips
People from Kozani (regional unit)